20 Cigarettes may refer to:

 20 Cigarettes (play), play and radio play written by Marcy Kahan
 20 Cigarettes (film), 2010 Italian film